"Remember When" is the 80th episode of the HBO television series The Sopranos, the third episode of the second half of the show's sixth season, and the 15th episode of the season overall. Written by Terence Winter and directed by Phil Abraham, it originally aired on April 22, 2007, and was watched by 6.85 million viewers on its premiere.

Starring
 James Gandolfini as Tony Soprano
 Lorraine Bracco as Dr. Jennifer Melfi *
 Edie Falco as Carmela Soprano
 Michael Imperioli as Christopher Moltisanti
 Dominic Chianese as Corrado Soprano, Jr.
 Steven Van Zandt as Silvio Dante
 Tony Sirico as Paulie Gualtieri
 Robert Iler as Anthony Soprano, Jr. *
 Jamie-Lynn Sigler as Meadow Soprano *
 Aida Turturro as Janice Soprano Baccalieri *
 Steven R. Schirripa as Bobby Baccalieri
 Frank Vincent as Phil Leotardo

* = credit only

Guest starring
 Jerry Adler as Hesh Rabkin

Also guest starring

Synopsis
The FBI recovers the body of bookie Willie Overall  Tony's first murder  based on information from Soprano family capo Larry Boy Barese. Tony and Paulie drive to Miami to lay low until the heat is off. On the way down, Tony asks Paulie how Johnny heard about Ralphie's joke about his wife  the incident which nearly led to hostilities between the Soprano and Lupertazzi families  but Paulie says he does not know. While Paulie was Tony's role model growing up, Tony now doubts his loyalty and usefulness. In Miami, the two men meet Beansie's Cuban contacts and agree to trade in stolen goods. Tony also arranges a bridge loan of $200,000 from Hesh to cover a string of losing sports bets.

Larry tells the FBI that the late Jackie Aprile, Sr. killed Overall. Upon receiving this news, Tony rents a sport fishing boat to celebrate with Paulie. However, Paulie is uneasy as he remembers the killing of Big Pussy on a boat. On the open sea, Tony questions Paulie again about the joke leak; Paulie again denies involvement. Tony glances at a hatchet and some fishing knives, but the tension passes. That night, Paulie has a dream in which he sees Pussy and, in a panic, asks him how he would handle his own death. Back in New Jersey, Paulie sends Tony and Carmela a $2,000 espresso machine; Tony tells her that they owe their lifestyle to people like Paulie.

In New York City, Faustino "Doc" Santoro and his bodyguard are murdered in a hit arranged by Phil, who becomes the new boss of the Lupertazzi family.

Junior is visited at his mental care center by his former soldiers Pat Blundetto and Beppy Scerbo. Junior begs them to aid his escape but soon loses his resolve. He returns to his old mob habits, bribing an orderly and organizing an illicit poker game for other patients. Professor Lynch, a patient Junior teases, informs on him and the game is ended. Junior finds an admiring follower in a young patient named Carter Chong, who has been institutionalized for his anger issues.

Junior assaults Professor Lynch and is given a new regimen of sedatives. Carter devises a plan to distract the orderlies handing the pills to Junior so that he can covertly throw them away. Some of the drugs were meant to combat Junior's incontinence, and he soon humiliatingly wets himself. The orderly is fired for taking bribes and Junior is threatened with a transfer to a less pleasant, state-run facility if he does not take his medications. He complies with the treatment, much to Carter's disillusionment. Junior tries to make up with him, but calls him "Anthony." At a piano recital, Carter starts throwing paper balls at the pianist; when Junior shows disapproval, Carter becomes enraged and ferociously attacks him.

Junior is next seen with the other patients (though not Carter) receiving animal-assisted therapy in the garden. He is in a wheelchair, with one arm in a cast, apart from the others.

Deceased
 Willie Overall: A bookie shot dead by Tony Soprano with a revolver on orders from "Johnny Boy" Soprano. It was Tony's first murder at the age of 22 (shown in a flashback to 1982).
 Faustino "Doc" Santoro: killed after leaving a massage parlor in New York City by multiple gunshots from a trio of gunmen on orders from Phil Leotardo to take over his Lupertazzi crime family boss's title and/or as a revenge for the Gerry Torciano murder and/or as payback for his insults done to Phil.
 Unnamed Bodyguard: killed alongside "Doc" Santoro.

Title reference
 During dinner with Paulie and Beansie, Tony says "'Remember when' is the lowest form of conversation", being irritated by Paulie's constant digging up of the past.

Production
 "Remember When" was the career directorial debut of Phil Abraham, a longtime Sopranos cinematographer ever since the first season of the show. Abraham initially started only as a camera operator for the TV series.
 Lin-Manuel Miranda, writer and future star of Hamilton and In the Heights, makes a brief appearance in this episode as the bellman with whom Tony and Paulie briefly converse from the car. It was Miranda's first television acting role: he later noted the scene demonstrates his overall lack of experience, as he is visibly looking for his mark as he enters the scene.
 This episode marked the last appearance of actor Vincent Pastore in his role of Salvatore Bonpensiero.

Connections to prior episodes
 Paulie remembers the time Ralphie was obsessed with Gladiator and hit Georgie with a chain, which happened in the Season 3 episode "University".
 Tony repeatedly asks Paulie if he told Johnny Sack about the off-color joke that Ralph told about a mole on Ginny "Sack"'s posterior (in the episode "No Show"). Paulie denies this (Paulie actually did tell it to Johnny Sack, in the episode "Christopher").
 Tony checks into a hotel in Miami using the fake surname “Spears.” This is the same name Tony uses when consulting a new psychiatrist in "Guy Walks into a Psychiatrist's Office...".
 Beansie is a paraplegic and has to void in a bag due to the injuries he sustained when Richie Aprile ran over him in the Season 2 episode "Toodle-Fucking-Oo".
 Tony recalls finding a painting of himself as a general at Paulie's house, which occurred in the Season 5 finale "All Due Respect".
 When Paulie boards a boat with Tony, this episode uses flashback scenes from the murder of Big Pussy on a boat, taken from the Season 2 finale "Funhouse".

Music
 The song playing on the radio as Tony and Paulie travel through the Fredericksburg, Virginia area (according to the station identification for WWUZ heard in this scene) was "Rock On", by David Essex.
 The instrumental piece played in the bar during Tony and Paulie's stop in Virginia is an instrumental version of "I Just Wanna Stop" by Gino Vannelli.
The piano piece playing in the hotel canteen, when Tony tells Paulie off, is the theme for the movie Terms of Endearment, composed by Michael Gore.
 The song Junior sings with the other patients is "Take Me Home, Country Roads", a song made famous in 1971 by John Denver.
 The instrumental piece played over the end credits is "Sing, Sing, Sing (With a Swing)" by the Benny Goodman Orchestra.

References

External links
"Remember When"  at HBO

2007 American television episodes
The Sopranos (season 6) episodes
Television episodes written by Terence Winter